{{DISPLAYTITLE:C21H18O12}}
The molecular formula C21H18O12 (molar mass: 462.36 g/mol, exact mass: 462.079826 u) may refer to:

 Scutellarin, a flavone glucuronide
 Luteolin-7-O-glucuronide, a flavone glucuronide

Molecular formulas